Verkhoyansk is a town in Sakha Republic, Russia

Verkhoyansk may also refer to:
 Verkhoyansk Urban Settlement, a municipal formation of the Town of Verkhoyansk in Verkhoyansky District of Sakha Republic
 Verkhoyansk District, a district in Sakha Republic, Russia
 Verkhoyansk Range, a mountain range in Sakha Republic, Russia
 Verkhoyansk mine, a silver mine in Sakha Republic, Russia